Robert Black is a former American football player and coach.  He served as head football coach of Sewanee: The University of the South in Sewanee, Tennessee from 2007 and 2010, compiling a record of 4–34. He previously served as the defensive coordinator at Sewanee in addition to coaching at TMI — The Episcopal School of Texas and the Montgomery Bell Academy. Black was as Sewanee's 29th head football coach.

Head coaching record

College

References

Year of birth missing (living people)
Living people
High school football coaches in Tennessee
Sewanee Tigers football coaches
Sportspeople from Nashville, Tennessee
Players of American football from Nashville, Tennessee